Simone Giuliano (born 28 April 1997) is an Italian football player. He is under contract with Serie D club ASD Marina di Ragusa Calcio.

Club career
He made his Serie C debut for Sicula Leonzio on 2 September 2017 in a game against Matera.

References

External links
 
 

1997 births
Footballers from Palermo
Living people
Italian footballers
Association football defenders
Italy youth international footballers
Palermo F.C. players
A.S.D. Sicula Leonzio players
A.S. Pro Piacenza 1919 players
Serie C players
Serie D players